Juhani Keto (20 September 1947 – 26 August 2018) was a Finnish basketball player.

Keto was a six-time Finnish champion and three-time Finnish Cup winner. Representing Tapion Honka, Turun NMKY and Torpan Pojat, he also achieved two SM-sarja bronze medals.

Keto had 74 caps for the Finnish national team with whom he won Nordic championship in 1968 and took part in 1972 Olympic Trials.

Keto died at the age of 70 on 16 August 2018. His daughter was one time married to world record swimmer Jani Sievinen.

Trophies and awards
 SM-sarja championship in 1969, 1970, 1971, 1972, 1973, and 1978
 bronze in 1974 and 1977
 Finnish cup championship in 1968, 1971, and 1972
 Nordic championship with national team in 1968

Sources

References

1947 births
2018 deaths
Finnish men's basketball players
Sportspeople from Helsinki
Torpan Pojat players
Centers (basketball)
Power forwards (basketball)
20th-century Finnish people